James Buchanan (1849–1897) was a Scottish teacher and founder of St. Margaret's School, Edinburgh.

Life and career
He was born in 1849 to John Buchanan (a house proprietor) and Janet Paton. He later attended St. Andrews University.  There he received prizes in both Latin and English.  He also played Kate Kennedy in the annual procession.

After graduating, he worked in Buckie school and then George Watson's Ladies' College.  He then set up his own school, St. Margaret's.

He married Annie Custance Carr in 1884.

He died on 21 September 1897, of "cerebral apoplexy".

Further reading
Patrick, L.M.D. & Bowie, J.L.F.: Fortiter Vivamus. Mainstream Publishing, 1990. .

References

1849 births
1897 deaths
Founders of Scottish schools and colleges
Scottish educators
19th-century British philanthropists